Favignana is a comune including three islands (Favignana, Marettimo and Levanzo) of the Aegadian Islands, southern Italy.

Island
The island of Favignana is famous for its tuna fisheries and is now a popular tourist destination with frequent hydrofoil connections to the mainland.

History

In ancient times Favignana was called Aegusa, meaning "goat island" in Greek (Αιγούσα). The present name is derived from Favonio, an Italian name for the foehn wind. The Phoenicians established an outpost on the island as a stopping point on their trans-Mediterranean trading routes until the defeat of the Carthaginian army during the First Punic War.

On 10 March 241 BC, a major naval battle was fought a short distance offshore between the two powers. Two hundred Roman ships under the consul Gaius Lutatius Catulus met and decisively defeated a much larger Carthaginian fleet of 400 ships, with the Romans sinking 120 Carthaginian vessels and taking 10,000 prisoners. So many dead Phoenicians washed ashore on the northeastern part of Favignana that the shoreline there acquired the name "Red Cove" (Cala Rossa) from the bloodshed. The Romans took possession of the island under the terms of the treaty that ended the war.

In the early Middle Ages, Favignana was captured by Arabs and was used as a base for the Islamic conquest of Sicily. The Arabs constructed a castle on top of the tallest hill called Santa Caterina. Soon after, the Normans took possession of the island, and built fortifications there in 1081.

Under the Aragonese rulers of Sicily, Favignana and the other Aegadian Islands were hired out to Genoese merchants and in the 15th century the islands were granted to one Giovanni de Karissima, who adopted the grand title "Baron of Tuna".

The plentiful tuna fish found offshore were first exploited systematically under the Spanish from about the 17th century onwards. Facing severe financial problems from their ongoing wars, the Spanish sold the islands to the Marquis Pallavicino of Genoa in 1637. The Pallavicini substantially developed the economy of the island, prompting the establishment of the modern town of Favignana around the Castello San Giacomo. In 1874, the Pallavicino family sold the Aegadian Islands to Ignazio Florio, the son of a wealthy mainland industrialist, for two million liras. He invested heavily in Favignana and built a major tuna cannery on the island, bringing prosperity to many of the inhabitants. Calcarenite quarries were also opened with stone being exported to Tunisia and Libya.
During the 20th century,
Favignana's economy slumped between the two World Wars and many inhabitants emigrated to the mainland and abroad. The fishery declined with the rise of factory fishing after World War II. Thanks to the Parodi brothers, who bought the factory—after the troubles of the Florio family—tuna fishing continued through the 1980s. The factory is now a museum due to the unavoidable decline.

The island's fortunes were turned around by the advent of tourism from the late 1960s onwards.

During World War II, American Forces under Gen. Patton drove the Axis forces from Sicily. Two American officers, Lt. Louis Testa, and Capt. R.E. Gerard, were a two-man ‘expedition’  which ‘captured' the three Aegadian Islands and 1027 prisoners. The officers went over from a Sicilian fishing boat, which they paid $3. They went ashore on Favignana Island and the Italian Lt. Colonel surrendered it along with Levanzo and Marittimo islands and their garrisons.

Geography
The island is often described as having a "butterfly" shape. Favignana town is located on a narrow isthmus connecting the two "wings", which have quite different characteristics. It is topped by a fort, originally established by the Saracens. It was used by the Italian military and closed to the public. It has now been abandoned. A number of small islands are situated off the south coast of Favignana.

Main sights

The island is famous for its caves of calcarenite rock (locally known as "tufo") and the ancient fishing technique of tonnara, with the trapping and mattanza (slaughter) of bluefin tuna.

As the island consists mainly of calcareous rocks, there are few beaches on the island; however, it is a popular site for scuba diving, snorkeling, and for day trips from nearby Trapani.

Notable people
 
 
Pat Varsallona, former footballer

See also
 List of islands of Italy

References

Further reading
 Newspaper  article in the PM Daily, Thursday August 12, 1943 NYC
Mattanza by Theresa Maggio, an American writer's account of the Favignana's springtime tonnara.

External links

Detailed information about Favignana and his history

Municipalities of the Province of Trapani
Castles in Italy
Aegadian Islands